Christer Johansson is a male former international table tennis player from Sweden.

He won a bronze medal at the 1967 World Table Tennis Championships in the Swaythling Cup (men's team event) with Hans Alsér, Kjell Johansson (his brother) and Bo Persson.

He was a two times gold medal winner in the team event at the European Table Tennis Championships and later became national coach of Sweden.

See also
 List of table tennis players
 List of World Table Tennis Championships medalists

References

Swedish male table tennis players
Swedish table tennis coaches
Living people
World Table Tennis Championships medalists
Year of birth missing (living people)